Manfred Nerlinger (born 27 September 1960 in Munich, Bavaria) is a German former weightlifter, trainer and entrepreneur.

Biography
He started with weightlifting in 1973. Competing in the superheavyweight category, he participated in four Summer Olympics, and won two bronze medals and one silver medal. Nerlinger participated in 11 World Championships, winning 3 medals in the snatch, 7 medals in the clean and jerk, 2 of them gold medals, and 5 medals in the combined competition.

He also participated in 10 European Championships, winning one medal in the snatch, 6 medals in the clean and jerk, one of them a gold medal, and 5 medals in the combined competition, one of them a gold medal. In 1993 he lifted a world record clean and jerk with 247.5 kg.

Nerlinger also lifted 37 German records. His personal bests were, before 1993: 197.5 kg snatch, 260.0 kg clean and jerk, 455.0 kg combined; after weight categories were changed in 1993: 192.5 kg snatch, 247.5 kg clean and jerk, 440.0 kg combined. Since 2000 he works as national youth trainer in the German weightlifting federation (BVDG). He also runs a shop selling weightlifting products.

Notes and references

External links 
Manfred Nerlinger at Database Weightlifting
Manfred Nerlinger at Lift Up

1960 births
Living people
Sportspeople from Munich
German male weightlifters
Olympic weightlifters of West Germany
Olympic weightlifters of Germany
Weightlifters at the 1984 Summer Olympics
Weightlifters at the 1988 Summer Olympics
Weightlifters at the 1992 Summer Olympics
Weightlifters at the 1996 Summer Olympics
Olympic silver medalists for West Germany
Olympic bronze medalists for West Germany
Olympic bronze medalists for Germany
Olympic medalists in weightlifting
Medalists at the 1992 Summer Olympics
Medalists at the 1988 Summer Olympics
Medalists at the 1984 Summer Olympics
European Weightlifting Championships medalists
World Weightlifting Championships medalists